Yordan Danchev (born 27 August 1970) is a Bulgarian rower. He competed in two events at the 1992 Summer Olympics.

References

1970 births
Living people
Bulgarian male rowers
Olympic rowers of Bulgaria
Rowers at the 1992 Summer Olympics
Sportspeople from Plovdiv